In Greek mythology, Epistrophus (: Ancient Greek: Ἐπίστροφος) may refer to:

Epistrophus, son of Iphitus by Hippolyte or Thrasybule and brother of Schedius. He was counted among the suitors of Helen. Together with his brother he led the Phocians on the side of the Achaeans in the Trojan War, commanding forty ships. Epistrophus, was killed at the Trojan war by Hector. Both brothers' bones, were carried back and buried at Anticyra. Their purported tomb existed until the Roman times.
Epistrophus, an ally of the Trojans, leader of the Halizones.
Epistrophus, son of Euenus, grandson of Selepius and brother of Mynes; both brothers were killed by Achilles during the latter's invasion in Lyrnessus.

Notes

References 

 Apollodorus, The Library with an English Translation by Sir James George Frazer, F.B.A., F.R.S. in 2 Volumes, Cambridge, MA, Harvard University Press; London, William Heinemann Ltd. 1921. ISBN 0-674-99135-4. Online version at the Perseus Digital Library. Greek text available from the same website.
 Gaius Julius Hyginus, Fabulae from The Myths of Hyginus translated and edited by Mary Grant. University of Kansas Publications in Humanistic Studies. Online version at the Topos Text Project.
 Homer, The Iliad with an English Translation by A.T. Murray, Ph.D. in two volumes. Cambridge, MA., Harvard University Press; London, William Heinemann, Ltd. 1924. . Online version at the Perseus Digital Library.
 Homer, Homeri Opera in five volumes. Oxford, Oxford University Press. 1920. . Greek text available at the Perseus Digital Library.
 Tzetzes, John, Allegories of the Iliad translated by Goldwyn, Adam J. and Kokkini, Dimitra. Dumbarton Oaks Medieval Library, Harvard University Press, 2015. 

Achaean Leaders
Characters in Greek mythology